The Edouard Suenson Memorial is located in front of Nyboder on Store Kongensgade in Copenhagen, Denmark. It commemorates Vice Admiral Edouard Suenson who commanded the Danish ships in the Battle of Heligoland 9 May 1864. The monument was designed by Theobald Stein and inaugurated on 9 May 1889. The bust was cast in Lauritz Rasmussen's bronze foundry.

Description
  
 
The monument consists of a bust of Suenson mounted on a high plinth decorated with a laurel wreath and prows and Suenson's coat of arms. A pair of lions rest at the base of the plinth. On its front side, it has the inscription: "VICE-ADMIRAL/EDOUARD SUENSON/Vorn  13 APRIL 1805/DIED 16 MAY 1887 The foot of the plinth is guarded by bronze lions which hold a coat of arms with the inscription "HELGOLAND/9 MAY/1864".

References

Further reading
 Zinglersen, Bent: Københavnske monumenter og mindesmærker, 1974, p. 183-184 
 Kraks Legat: Monumenter, mindesmærker og statuer. I København, Frederiksberg og Gjentofte, 1944, p. 21 

Monuments and memorials in Copenhagen
Sculptures by Theobald Stein
Danish military memorials and cemeteries
Busts in Denmark
Bronze sculptures in Copenhagen
Outdoor sculptures in Copenhagen
1889 sculptures
1889 establishments in Denmark